Nejib Belhedi (born July 25, 1952 in Sfax) is a Tunisian Marathon Icy and Iron open-water swimmer.

Achievements
 Kerkennah Island- Sfax, 20 km, 7H24min, the First Marathon Swimmer in Tunisia and the first who swam Kerkennah – Sfax on 25 June 1991 on the occasion of the commemoration of the creation of Tunisian Army
English Channel (England to France) on September 15–16, 1993 in 16 hours 35 minutes, a swim on the highest tide under Force 4 conditions. First and only Tunisian who accomplished the English Channel, the Channel Swimming Association created a trophy bringing the name of Belhedi : Belhedi Trophy for the Channel Swim on the Highest Tide honoring the Channel Swimmers who swim the Channel on the Highest Tide in the season.
 Cap Bon - La Marsa, 35K on May 30, 1992 in 11 hours 14 minutes.
 24 hours non-stop in a swimming pool in Tataouine on July 6–7, 1993. Total distance swam 51.577 kilometers.
 Strait of Sicily, from Pantelleria to Kelibia, 72K on June 17, 1995. Swim was stopped after 17 hours due to numerous jellyfish stings.
 La Galite Channel in Tunisia on July 31, 1999 from La Galite Island to Cap Serrat, 40K in 7 hours 15 minutes.
Nejib Belhedi accomplished 1400 km along the total coast of Tunisia during 2011-2012 all seasons
Title of the World of Man of the Year 2016 for his Iron Swim and Ouma for kids realizations, honored on Bizerta Resort Bierta Tunisia by WOWSA on 12 September 2017 
 Nejib Belhedi swam Tunisian Dam lakes ( Icy & Cold Swim): 
Oued Mallegue Dam: 6 Marsh 2013, 5 °C (41 °F), 6 km, 2 H 
Jedliane Kasserine Dam: 20 Feb. 2013, 3 °C (37,4 °F), 3 km, 1 H 
 Sidi Barrak Dam :20 April 2013, 10 °C (50 °F), 15 km, 4H 
Sidi Salem Dam: 23 Marsh 2013, 7 °C (44,6 °F), 13 km, 3H25 
Oued Mallegue Dam: 26 Dec 2017, 2,5C°(36, 5 °F), 3 km, 43 mn 
Barbara Dam: 20 January 2018, 1 °C (33, 8 °F), 3 km, 1H45
 On August 17, 2013, Belhedi swam between the Diomede Islands in a time of  39 minutes, covering 4 km in 2 °C and making the circuit from Russia to USA in a way different from that swum by Lynne Cox.
On 15, 16, 17, 18 September 2018 Nejib Belhedi accomplished successfully 120 km Swim No Stop (Tunisia- Gulf of Gabes) from the Southern Salin Basin in Thyna-Sfax, through the middle of Boughrara Gulf to Jilj Island in 76 hours 30 minutes at the age of 66.This is included as the longest solo swim in sea by the World Open Water Swimming Association
In September 2018, Nejib Belhedi was honored by the Minister of Youth and Sport Affairs of Tunisia for his successful 120 km Swim Sfax-Djerba
In October 2018, Nejib Belhedi was awarded National Defence Shield by the Minister of National Defence of Tunisia for his successful 120 km Swim Sfax- Djerba 
On 10 November 2018, Neib Belhedi was identified as the title holder of the winner of the longest solo swim in sea in history by WOWSA in Olympic Club - San Francisco 
 Iron Swim accomplishments: 
 On 14 February 2015, he boat pulled 180 kg for 7 km in the Kerkennah Sea in Tunisia.
 On 24 April 2015, he boat pulled 180 km for 11 km around Kerkennah Island in Tunisia. 
 On 24 May 2015, he boat pulled 180 kg with two children, pilot Mahdi Aghir and observer Mahdi Aghir over 15.26 km across the Golfe de Skanes in the Monastir Sea in 6 hours 40 minutes from the One Resort Hotel beach to Dkhlia beach while being escorted by pilot Mahdi Aghir and pulling two children in a boat. The observer was Mohamed Rekik. 
 On 31 July 2015, he boat pulled a mini Catamaran with 180 kg over 21 km in the Gulf of Gabes in Tunisia. 
 On 10 September 2015, he boat pulled 180 kg over 20 km in Djerba Island Sea in Tunisia. 
 On 7 October 2015, he boat pulled a 1.5-ton boat carrying a camel and his master over 4 km in the Mahdia Port in Tunisia (the Camel Swim). 
 On 23 October 2015, he boat pulled a 2-ton boat with 3 people over 4 km in the Mahdia Port, Tunisia (the Olive Tree Swim). 
 On 7 November 2015, he boat pulled a 21-ton ship named Hannibal with people 168 meters in Marina Tabarka in Tunisia with observer Hatem Askri. 
 On 19 November 2015, he boat pulled a 22-ton ship named Mahdi with people over 200 meters in 11 minutes in Port El Kantaoui, Tunisia with observer Nabil Ouerzli. 
 On 23 December 2015, he boat pulled a convoy of two ships totalling 70 tons including a ship name Mohamed Ali with people over 350 meters in 39 minutes Port El Kantaoui, Tunisia. 
 On 26 March 2016, he boat-pulled a 23-ton ship named Albatross with observer Hatem Askri and a football team on board over 500 meters in 23 minutes in Marina Tabarka in Tunisia. 
 On 28 May 2016, he boat pulled a convoy of 2 ships totalling 70 tons with people over 550 meters in 20 minutes in the Bizerta Channel in Tunisia. 
 On 23 October 2016, he boat pulled a convoy of 3 ships totalling 100 tons including the 40-ton Mohamed Habib with pilot Rachid Jbalia, the 25-ton Noura with pilot Atef Neffati, and the 35-ton Bibane with pilot Nabil Jannadi over 550 meters in 32 minutes 30 seconds in the Bizerta Channel in Tunisia. 
 On 22 May 2017, he boat pulled a ship named Hached - SONOTRAK totalling 1014 tons with people over 425 meters in 25 minutes in the Sfax Port in Tunisia.
 Nejib Belhedi Won Poseidon Iron Swim Trophy as the World unbeatable Pananrmal Iron Swimmer on 19 November 2015 in El Kantaoui Port 
 Nejib Belhedi completed  the longest  Marthon Swimming duration in SEA 76Hours 30 min, Solo,  No Stop, No assisted from South of Sfax city ( Thyna)  to Behind Djerba Island ( Jlij Island - Boughrara Lake), 120 km, on 15–18 September 2018?  under the regulation   of  The World Open Water Swimming Association ( WOWSA)
 Nejib Belhedi entered in Guinness Book on 5 October 2019 at Redondo Beach ( Los Angeles), Ocean fiest event organized by WOWSA - as Word Record Holder  the longest swimming in open sea under World Open Water Swimming regulation for 76 Hr30 min on 15–18 September 2018 . This Guinness book registration of Nejib Belhedi is the first  in the history of the Sport of Tunisia.
 Nejib Belhedi ( 69 years old ) completed brilliantly his no stop swim 40 km from the Big Kuriat Island to Boujaafer Beach ( Sousse) in exceptional record :  10 H 43'15" on 11 August 2020, this race is  realized  under WOWSA Swimming rules  and organized in partnership with the association : " Notre Grand Bleu " aiming the sensitization of public  for the preservation of Turtle

20.Nejib  Belhedi completed Djerba Between 30 October and 1 November 2020, the Pearl of Peace, a 155 km swim around Djerba, Tunisia in 47 hours 50 minutes 10 seconds at the age of 69. It was the longest unassisted circumnavigation swim by a man ratified by WOWSA. He was honored on 6 December 2020 by the Hasdrubal Marathon Swimming Hall of Fame Tunisia in partnership with the Hasdrubal chain presided by Sir Raouf Amouri and WOWSA. This Hall of Fame is located on Djerba Island at Hasdrubal Prestige Thalassa & Spa (Tourist zone of Midoun) in Tunisia.

Nejib Belhedi as Organizer and Representative
Nejib Belhedi is the organizer of the 2017 Global Open Water Swimming Conference which was held in Bizerta Resort from 9 to 14 September 2018
He is the conceiver, promoter and organizer of all editions; Dialog across the Sea 2009–2010, Tunisian Islands Tour, Swim of Peace 2007 
He is the organizer of the intercontinental Iron Swim Parade in Bizerta Channel on 13 September 2017 
Nejib Belhedi is the Organizer of all his Marathon Swims, Iron Swims and Ouma for kids events 
Belhedi is the organizer of The Dialog Sahara - North Pole - August 2013 in Douz -South of Tunisia and Little Diomede - Bering Strait
Belhedi is the Representative of The Channel Swimming Association in Tunisia, Libya and Algeria

References

https://www.openwaterpedia.com/index.php?title=Nejib_Belhedi

http://www.jawharafm.net/ar/article/السباح-التونسي-بالهادي-ينجح-في-تحطيم-رقم-قياسي-عالمي-جديد/96/29421

http://dailynews.openwaterswimming.com/2018/11/nejib-belhedi-continues-with-his.html

https://www.openwaterswimming.com/nejib-belhedi-honored-by-guinness-world-records/

http://dailynews.openwaterswimming.com/2018/09/its-go-for-nejib-belhedi.html

Sportspeople from Tunis
1952 births
Living people
Tunisian male swimmers